Wensu Town is a town and the county seat of Wensu County, in the Aksu Prefecture of Xinjiang, China.

References 

Township-level divisions of Xinjiang
County seats in Xinjiang
Aksu Prefecture